Blue Stars is a professional basketball team in the Lebanese Basketball League. They competed in the FIBA Asia Champions Cup 2007, finishing in 5th place. In May 2009, after the club’s president suspended the financial sponsorship of the club, the administrative committee met and decided to dissolve the basketball team and officially give the players who signed the club’s statements books of dispensation, and decided to participate in the second division next season.

Notable players
  Jean Abdel-Nour (2003–09)
  Rony Fahed (2002–2007)
  Brian Beshara
  Ronnie Fields (2006)
  Fadi El Khatib (2006–07)
  Rodrigue Akl 
  Cedric Henderson
  Jerald Honeycutt
  Roy Samaha (2004–07)
  Dickey Simpkins (2005–06)

References

External links
Club Blue Stars site

Basketball teams in Lebanon